Reginald James Berry (21 June 1892 – 5 May 1944) was an Australian rules footballer who played with St Kilda in the Victorian Football League (VFL). He served in the Australian Imperial Force during the First World War, being wounded at Gallipoli.

Notes

External links 

1892 births
1944 deaths
Australian rules footballers from Melbourne
St Kilda Football Club players
Australian military personnel of World War I
People from Frankston, Victoria
Military personnel from Melbourne